The list of ecoregions in Indiana are listings of terrestrial ecoregions (see also, ecosystem) in the United States' State of Indiana, as defined separately by the United States Environmental Protection Agency (USEPA), and the World Wildlife Fund.

USEPA
The USEPA ecoregion classification system has four levels, but only Levels I, III, and IV are shown on this list. Level I divides North America into 15 broad ecoregions (or biomes).  Indiana is within the Eastern Temperate Forest environment, Level I region.  Level IV ecoregions (denoted by numbers and letters) are a further subdivision of Level III ecoregions  (denoted by numbers alone).
54 Central Corn Belt Plains
54a - Illinois/Indiana Prairie
54b - Chicago Lake Plain
54c - Kankakee Marsh
54d - Sand Area
55 Eastern Corn Belt Plains
55a - The Clayey, High Lime Till Plains
55b - The Loamy, High Lime Till Plains
55d - The Pre-Wisconsinan Drift Plains
55f - The Whitewater Interlobate Area
56 Southern Michigan/Northern Indiana Drift Plains
56a - The Lake Country
56b - The Elkhart Till Plains
56c - The Middle Tippecanoe Plains
56d - The Michigan Lake Plain
57 Huron/Erie Lake Plains
57a - The Maumee Lake Plains
71 Interior Plateau
71a - The Crawford Uplands
71b - The Mitchell Plain
71c - The Norman Upland
71d - The Northern Bluegrass
72 Interior River Valleys and Hills
72a - Wabash-Ohio Bottomlands
72b - Glaciated Wabash Lowlands
72c - The Southern Wabash Lowlands

World Wildlife Fund

References

See: Ricketts, Taylor H; Eric Dinerstein; David M. Olson; Colby J. Loucks; et al. (1999). Terrestrial Ecoregions of North America: a Conservation Assessment. Island Press; Washington, DC

See also
Geography of Indiana
Climate of Indiana
List of ecoregions in the United States (EPA)
List of ecoregions in the United States (WWF)

Indiana
United States science-related lists
Indiana geography-related lists
Environment of Indiana
Indiana